Merriman may refer to:

People

Surname
 Arthur Douglas Merriman (1892–1972), English military officer
 Boyd Merriman, 1st Baron Merriman (1880–1962), British Conservative Party politician and judge
 Brian Merriman (1749–1805), Irish poet and teacher
 Daniel Merriman (1838–1912), American minister and museum president
 Edgar C. Merriman (1840–1894), American military officer
 Eric Merriman (1924–2003), British comedy scriptwriter for radio and TV
 Frederick Merriman (disambiguation), multiple people
 Gregory Merriman (born 1988), Australian ice dancer
 Helen Bigelow Merriman (1844–1933), American painter, art collector, and philanthropist
 Huw Merriman (born 1973, British Conservative Party politician, Member of Parliament (MP) for Bexhill & Battle
 James Merriman (born 1984), Welsh rugby union player
 James Merriman (born 1985), Canadian soccer coach
 James A. Merriman (1869-1946), American physician and newspaper editor
 John Merriman (disambiguation), multiple people
 Marcus Merriman (1940–2006), American historian
 Nan Merriman (1920–2012), American opera singer
 Nick Merriman (born 1960), British museum director
 Percy Merriman (1882–1966), British musician
 Richard Merriman (born 1958), English cricketer
 R. B. Merriman (1876–1945), American historian
 Robert E. Merriman (1916–1983), American actor and director 
 Ryan Merriman (born 1983), American actor
 Shawne Merriman (born 1984) American football player
 Stefan Merriman (born 1973), New Zealand enduro rider
 Truman A. Merriman (1839–1892), U.S. Representative from New York
 William Merriman  (1838–1917) Colonel, CIE, British officer Royal Engineers & FA Cup Finals goalkeeper

First name
 Merriman Smith, Pulitzer Prize-winning reporter
 Merriman Colbert Harris, Methodist missionary bishop
 Merriman Cuninggim, Methodist minister and university administrator

Others
 Henry Seton Merriman, pen name of English author Hugh Stowell Scott (1862–1903)
 King Merriman, a title of Australian Aboriginal elder Umbarra (died 1904)

Places
 Merriman Island, Wallaga Lake, New South Wales, Australia
 Merriman, Nebraska, a village in Cherry County, Nebraska (USA)
 Merriman, Northern Cape, a village in South Africa
Merriman Park/University Manor, Dallas, a neighborhood association

See also
 Merryman

English-language surnames

English-language names